Stand Up and Fight is a 1939 American Western film directed by W.S. Van Dyke and starring Wallace Beery and Robert Taylor. The supporting cast includes Florence Rice, Helen Broderick, Charles Bickford, Barton MacLane, Charley Grapewin, and John Qualen. Playwright Jane Murfin and novelists Harvey Fergusson and James M. Cain shared screenwriting credit.

Plot
Blake Cantrell (Robert Taylor), an aristocrat from Maryland and a well-groomed cynic, uses his organized hunt to announce his imminent bankruptcy. In order to pay off his debts, Blake is forced to sell even his slaves, instead of freeing them, which causes the disapproval of his guest Susan Griffith (Florence Rice).

Later in the evening, when he tries to seduce the girl, she bumps him back and leaves the mansion urgently. However, Blake is also forced to leave his home, since it was sold to cover his debts. He arrives to Cumberland to get a job at his father's old friend, Colonel Webb (Jonathan Hale), the head of the Baltimore-Ohio railroad construction. Webb offers Blake a job which consists of spying on Starkey (Wallace Beery), the head of a competing shipping company, but Blake refuses. In the evening of the same day, Blake is jailed for a fight.

Cast

 Wallace Beery as Starkey
 Robert Taylor as Blake Cantrell
 Florence Rice as Susan Griffith
 Helen Broderick as Mandy Griffith
 Charles Bickford as Mr. Arnold (Morgan)
 Barton MacLane as Mr. Crowder
 Charley Grapewin as "Old Puff"
 John Qualen as Davy
 Robert Gleckler as Sheriff Barney
 Jonathan Hale as Colonel Webb

Box office
According to MGM records, the film earned $1,233,000 in the US and Canada and $607,000 elsewhere resulting in a profit of $183,000.

References

External links
 
 
 
 

1939 films
American historical films
Films directed by W. S. Van Dyke
1939 Western (genre) films
Metro-Goldwyn-Mayer films
American Western (genre) films
American black-and-white films
Films with screenplays by Jane Murfin
Films with screenplays by James M. Cain
1930s historical films
1930s English-language films
1930s American films